Eric Geboers (5 August 1962 – 6 May 2018) was a Belgian professional motocross racer and racing driver. He competed in the Motocross World Championships from 1980 to 1990, winning five world championships in eleven years. Geboers is notable for being the first motocross competitor to win world championships in the 125cc, 250cc, and 500cc divisions. Geboers' 39 career Grand Prix victories ranks him fifth overall among motocross world championship competitors.

In 1988, he was named the recipient of the Belgian National Sports Merit Award. In 2011, Geboers was named an FIM Legend for his motorcycling achievements. Geboers died in a drowning accident in 2018.

Biography
Geboers was born in Neerpelt, Belgium where his father owned a petrol station and also sold automobiles as well as mopeds and scooters. He was the youngest of five brothers who raced motorcycles, including his eldest brother, Sylvain Geboers who finished in the top three of the 250cc motocross world championships for five consecutive years between 1968 and 1972.

Geboers began racing professional motocross in the 1980 125cc motocross world championship for the Suzuki factory racing team managed by his brother Sylvain. He made an immediate impact by winning the 1980 125cc French Grand Prix in only the second Grand Prix of his career. He went on to win two more Grand Prix races in Germany and Czechoslovakia to finish the season ranked third in the championship behind Harry Everts and Michele Rinaldi. Geboers won three more Grand Prix races in the 1981 125cc motocross world championship, improving to second place in the championship behind Everts, who had successfully defended his title. In 1982, Geboers dominated the second half of the 125cc motocross world championship season by winning five of the last six Grand Prix races to claim his first world championship for Suzuki. He successfully defended his title for Suzuki in 1983 by winning six out of twelve Grand Prix races during the 125cc motocross world championship..

Suzuki's decision to withdraw from the motocross world championships at the end of the 1983 season led Geboers to sign a contract to become a member of the powerful Honda factory racing team that included the reigning world champion André Malherbe as well as David Thorpe and André Vromans. While with the Honda team, he was given the nickname The Kid by Honda team manager Steve Whitlock due to his small stature. He ended the year ranked fifth in the 500cc motocross world championship behind his three Honda teammates and Kawasaki-mounted Georges Jobé. Geboers improved to third place in the 1985 500cc motocross world championship behind his Honda teammates Malherbe and Thorpe and, this result was repeated in the 1986 world championship with the three Honda teammates capturing the top three results in the season final standings.

Whitlock convinced Geboers to compete in the 250cc world championship in 1987, with the promise that he could return to the 500cc class if he won the 250cc title. Geboers won five Grand Prix races to win the 1987 250cc world championship, earning a return to the premier 500cc division. The following year, he won his first of two FIM 500cc World Championships to become the first competitor to win FIM world championships in all three classes. His performance earned him the 1988 Belgian National Sports Merit Award and he was named the 1988 Belgian Sportsman of the year. Aged 28 years, Geboers retired at the top of his sport in 1990 by winning the premier 500cc world championship in his final season of competition. He won the final race of his career at the 1990 500cc United States Grand Prix.

Geboers also won the Le Touquet beach race three consecutive times between 1988 and 1990.

After his retirement from motocross racing, Geboers began a career in sports car endurance racing, competing in the 2001 and 2002 FIA GT Championship in events such as the 2001 FIA GT Jarama 500km and the Spa 24 Hours in 2001 and 2002. Geboers managed the Suzuki motocross team along with his brother, fielding Belgian riders Clement Desalle and Kevin Strijbos.

Death
Geboers died on May 6, 2018 in a drowning accident on a lake in Mol, Belgium after jumping off a boat to save his pet dog. Geboers immediately had difficulty and failed to surface. Rescue crews recovered his body the next day. The dog, a recent gift from his wife, reportedly survived. 

The final cause of death turned out to be cold shock. The surface of the water was quite warm that May 6th, but it was still icy below that.

Honours and awards 

 Belgian Sportsman of the year: 1988
 Belgian National Sports Merit Award: 1988
 First "Mr. 875cc" (winning world titles in 125/250/500cc): 1988. The second became Stefan Everts.

References

External links
 Sylvain Geboers Team Suzuki web site

1962 births
2018 deaths
Sportspeople from Limburg (Belgium)
Belgian racing drivers
FIA GT Championship drivers
People from Neerpelt
24 Hours of Spa drivers
Deaths by drowning
Accidental deaths in Belgium
Belgian motocross riders